Kristin Lems is an American musician, singer-songwriter, feminist, and author/educator in the field of teaching English as a Second Language (ESL).

Early life and education 
Lems grew up in Evanston, Illinois and started singing at a young age. She has an A.B. from The University of Michigan (1972). She earned master's degrees in West Asian Studies (1975) and Teaching English as a Second Language (1983) from the University of Illinois Urbana-Champaign.  She earned a Doctorate of Education in Reading and Language from National College of Education at National Louis University (2003). She spent time on a Fulbright fellowship training teachers in Algeria. In 1993 Lems joined the faculty of National Louis University, and as of 2022 she is a professor there.

Biography 
Lems' is known music and musical performances, for advocating for the Equal Rights Amendment, and for her work within the teaching of English as a second language.

Lems organized a local Womenfolk's Festival in Illinois that occurred on November 16, 1973. After that she became lead organizer for the first National Women's Music Festival that was held on the campus of the University of Illinois in 1974. Lems founded the festival because she wanted to provide more opportunities for women to perform, and she was particularly motivated after attending a folk festival with no women artists She continued as the lead organizer through 1978.

Lems has performed in concerts around the United States, and is primarily known for the singing in support of the Equal Rights Amendment, most notably with her song the Ballad of the ERA. In 1978 she described her goal of bringing music both to people who are politically motivated and women in general.

Selected works

Awards and honors 
Lems received the Humanist Heroine Award from the American Humanist Association in 1994. In 1996 the Freedom from Religion Foundation awarded her with their Freethought Heroine Award. In 2021, the Illinois Teachers of English to Speakers of Other Languages/Bilingual Education awarded Lems the Elliot Judd Outstanding Teacher Award.

See also
 List of feminists

References

External links 
 Official website
 
 Oral history interview by Veteran Feminists of America June 15, 2009

Living people
American women singers
University of Michigan alumni
University of Illinois Urbana-Champaign alumni
National Louis University alumni
National Louis University faculty
Year of birth missing (living people)
Equal Rights Amendment activists
American feminists